The 139th New York State Legislature, consisting of the New York State Senate and the New York State Assembly, met from January 5 to April 20, 1916, during the second year of Charles S. Whitman's governorship, in Albany.

Background
Under the provisions of the New York Constitution of 1894, re-apportioned in 1906 and 1907, 51 Senators and 150 assemblymen were elected in single-seat districts; senators for a two-year term, assemblymen for a one-year term. The senatorial districts were made up of entire counties, except New York County (twelve districts), Kings County (eight districts), Erie County (three districts) and Monroe County (two districts). The Assembly districts were made up of contiguous area, all within the same county.

At this time there were two major political parties: the Republican Party and the Democratic Party.

Elections
The New York state election, 1915, was held on November 2. No statewide elective offices were up for election. The voters rejected all amendments proposed by the Constitutional Convention of 1915.

Sessions
The Legislature met for the regular session at the State Capitol in Albany on January 5, 1916; and adjourned on April 20.

Thaddeus C. Sweet (R) was re-elected Speaker, with 94 votes against 45 for Joseph M. Callahan (D).

On February 8, the Legislature elected three Regents of the University of the State of New York: William Berri to fill the vacancy caused by the death of St. Clair McKelway, for a term to end on April 1, 1917; James Byrne to fill the vacancy caused by the death of Andrew J. Shipman, for a term to end on April 1, 1920; and Walter Guest Kellogg for a term of twelve years, beginning on April 1, 1916.

The Legislature enacted a new apportionment of Senate districts, and the number of assemblymen per county, which became law with the approval by the governor on May 1. The new apportionment was declared unconstitutional by the New York Court of Appeals in July 1916, and the New York state election, 1916, was held under the apportionment of 1907.

State Senate

Districts

Members
The asterisk (*) denotes members of the previous Legislature who continued in office as members of this Legislature.

Note: For brevity, the chairmanships omit the words "...the Committee on (the)..."

Employees
 Clerk: Ernest A. Fay
 Sergeant-at-Arms: Charles R. Hotaling
 Stenographer: John K. Marshall

State Assembly
Note: For brevity, the chairmanships omit the words "...the Committee on (the)..."

Assemblymen

Employees
 Clerk: Fred W. Hammond
 Sergeant-at-Arms: Harry W. Haines
 Principal Doorkeeper: Fred R. Smith
 Stenographer: Paul E. McCarthy
Postmaster: James H. Underwood

Notes

Sources
 LEGISLATURE OPENS WITH RUSH OF WORK in NYT on January 6, 1916
 Laws of the State of New York (139th Session) (Vol. III; 1916)

139
1916 in New York (state)
New York